Tacazzea is a genus of plants in the family Apocynaceae, first described in 1890. It is native to Africa.

Species

formerly included
moved to other genera (Buckollia, Petopentia)
 Tacazzea natalensis N.E.Br., synonym of Petopentia natalensis (Schltr.) Bullock
 Tacazzea tomentosa E.A.Bruce, synonym of Buckollia tomentosa (E.A.Bruce) Venter & R.L.Verh.

species of uncertain affinities

Gallery

References 

Periplocoideae
Apocynaceae genera
Taxa named by Joseph Decaisne